Bhagawati  is a Village Development Committee located in the Darchula District in the Sudurpashchim Province of western Nepal. At the time of the 1991 Nepal census it had a population of 2454 people residing in 435 individual households.

References

External links
UN map of the municipalities of Darchula District

Populated places in Darchula District